Thomas Fletcher (15 June 1881–1954) was an English footballer who played in the Football League for Derby County and Leicester Fosse.

References

1881 births
1954 deaths
English footballers
Association football forwards
English Football League players
Leicester City F.C. players
Derby County F.C. players